Mirjana Jovovic-Horvat (born October 2, 1949) is a sport shooter from Bosnia and Herzegovina. She competed in rifle shooting events at the Summer Olympics in 1984 and 1992.

Olympic results

References

1949 births
Living people
ISSF rifle shooters
Yugoslav female sport shooters
Bosnia and Herzegovina female sport shooters
Shooters at the 1984 Summer Olympics
Shooters at the 1992 Summer Olympics
Olympic shooters of Yugoslavia
Olympic shooters of Bosnia and Herzegovina